The Republic of China Naval Academy (CNA) is the service academy for the navy of the Republic of China (Taiwan), and is located at Zuoying District, Kaohsiung, Taiwan.

History
The academy was originally established as the Chinese Naval Academy at the Gaochang Temple in Shanghai on 16 June 1946. On 1 April 1947, the academy was moved to Tsingtao, Shantung. In April 1949, the academy was moved to Hsiamen, Fukien and to its present location in Kaohsiung, Taiwan in September in the same year. In 1994, the academy began to recruit female cadets for the first time.

Academics

School of Academic Studies
 Department of Electrical Engineering
 Department of Applied Science
 Department of Marine Science
 Department of Marine Mechanical Engineering
 Department of Information Management

General Education Center
 Humanities Section
 Social Science Section

School of Military Studies
 Tactics Section
 Marine Engineering Section
 Physical Training Section

Alumni
 Jason Yuan, Secretary-General of the National Security Council (2012-2014)
 Huang Shu-kuang, Chief of the General Staff
 Lee Chung-wei, Chairperson of Ocean Affairs Council
 Lee Hsi-ming, Chief of the General Staff (2017–2019)
 Pu Tze-chun, Vice Minister of National Defense (2017-2018)
 Tung Hsiang-lung, Minister of Veterans Affairs Council (2013-2016)

Transportation
The academy is accessible West from World Games Station of the Kaohsiung MRT.

See also
 List of universities in Taiwan
 Republic of China Navy
 Republic of China Military Academy
 Republic of China Air Force Academy

References

External links

 

1912 establishments in China
1949 establishments in Taiwan
Educational institutions established in 1912
Military academies of Taiwan
Naval academies
Academy
Universities and colleges in Kaohsiung
Zuoying District